Robert Perry Beaver (December 13, 1938 – July 11, 2014) was an American Muscogee politician and football coach.  He was principal chief of the Muscogee (Creek) Nation from 1996 until 2003.

Born in Muskogee, Oklahoma, Beaver attended Morris High School in Morris, Oklahoma, and then went to Murray State College, where he was a junior college football All-American  in 1958.  He received his bachelor's degree in mathematics from Central State College and his master's degree in education from Northwestern State University.

In 1961, playing under the name Bob Beaver, he was briefly a member of the Green Bay Packers of the National Football League. He then moved into high school coaching.  In 1977, he became the head coach at Jenks High School in Jenks, Oklahoma, where he led the team to its first two state championships in 1979 and 1982, and retired after the  1990 season.  His career record was 109–53.  He is a member of the American Indian Athletic Hall of Fame and the Oklahoma Coaches Association Hall of Fame.

Beaver was elected to the Creek Nation Council  in 1984.  In 1985, he became second chief. Beaver served as principal chief of the Muscogee (Creek) Nation from 1996 until 2003.  As chief he oversaw an expansion of tribal housing and development services.  He died at his home in Morris on July 11, 2014.

Notes

1938 births
2014 deaths
Politicians from Muskogee, Oklahoma
Muscogee people
University of Central Oklahoma alumni
Louisiana–Monroe Warhawks football players
Northwestern State University alumni
Native American leaders
Green Bay Packers players
High school football coaches in Oklahoma
People from Morris, Oklahoma
Sportspeople from Muskogee, Oklahoma
Players of American football from Oklahoma
People from Jenks, Oklahoma
20th-century Native Americans
21st-century Native Americans